Euchromia jacksoni is a species of moth in the subfamily Arctiinae. It is found in Uganda.

References

Endemic fauna of Uganda
Moths described in 1911
Euchromiina